The Japan women's national futsal team represents Japan in international women's futsal competitions and is controlled by the Japan Football Association. It is one of the strongest teams in Asia as the champions of the 2007, 2009 and 2013 Asian Indoor Games.

Results and fixtures

Legend

2023

2022

 Fixtures & Results (W futsal), JFA.jp

Coaching staff

Current coaching staff

Manager history

(If statistics are unavailable, display former coaches in bulleted list form)

Players

Current squad
The following players were named for a friendly tour on Spain, held from 13 to 25 November 2022.

Competitive record

Women's Futsal World Tournament

AFC Women's Futsal Asian Cup

Asian Indoor and Martial Arts Games
Asian Indoor and Martial Arts Games record
 2005 – Did not enter
 2007 –  Gold Medal
 2009 –  Gold Medal
 2013 –  Gold Medal
 2017 –  Silver Medal

See also

Women's
International footballers
National football team (Results)
National under-20 football team
National under-17 football team
National futsal team
Men's
International footballers
National football team (Results (2020–present))
National under-23 football team
National under-20 football team
National under-17 football team
National futsal team
National under-20 futsal team
National beach soccer team

References

External links
 Official website, JFA.jp 
 Japan national team 2021 schedule at JFA.jp 

Futsal
N
Asian women's national futsal teams
Women's national sports teams of Japan
Women's football in Japan